Troon (old) railway station was a railway station serving the town of Troon, South Ayrshire, Scotland. The station was originally part of the Glasgow, Paisley, Kilmarnock and Ayr Railway.

History 
The station opened on 5 August 1839, and closed to passengers on 2 May 1892 upon the opening of a new Troon station on a new loop line to the west. The original line remained open as a means of bypassing the new Troon station, and also to serve Troon Goods station which was located slightly to the north of the closed passenger station.

Today the goods station is also closed, and the line no longer carries through traffic. A long track from Barassie towards the station site still exists (plus several sidings), however it ends around the site of the goods station. This site was also used when the Ayrshire Coast Line was in the process of electrification as a maintenance depot for the equipment being used at the time. Once electrification was complete in 1986 the site was used as a civil engineers yard serving the nearby Shewalton tip and Hillhouse Quarry. This move resulted in the closure of the Irvine engineers yard.

Services

References

Notes

Sources 
 

Disused railway stations in South Ayrshire
Railway stations in Great Britain opened in 1839
Railway stations in Great Britain closed in 1892
Former Glasgow and South Western Railway stations
Troon